John Rutherford Allen (born December 15, 1953) is a retired United States Marine Corps four-star general, and former commander of the NATO International Security Assistance Force and U.S. Forces – Afghanistan (USFOR-A). On September 13, 2014, President Barack Obama appointed Allen as special presidential envoy for the Global Coalition to Counter ISIL (Islamic State of Iraq and the Levant). He was succeeded in that role by Brett McGurk on October 23, 2015. He is the co-author of Turning Point: Policymaking in the Era of Artificial Intelligence with Darrell M. West (Brookings Institution Press, 2020) and Future War and the Defence of Europe alongside Lieutenant General (Ret.) Ben Hodges and Professor Julian Lindley French (Oxford University Press, 2021). Allen was president of the Brookings Institution from October 2017 until his resignation on June 12, 2022.

Early life and education
Allen was born at Fort Belvoir, Virginia, on December 15, 1953; his father, Joseph K. Allen, was a Navy veteran of World War II and the Korean War who retired as a lieutenant commander. He attended Flint Hill School in Oakton, Virginia. He graduated with military honors from the U.S. Naval Academy with the Class of 1976, receiving a Bachelor of Science degree in Operations Analysis. He is a 1998 Distinguished Graduate of the National War College. He holds a Master of Arts degree in National Security Studies from Georgetown University, a Master of Science degree in Strategic Intelligence from the National Defense Intelligence College, and a Master of Science degree in National Security Strategy from the National War College of National Defense University.

Career
Following commissioning in 1976, Allen attended The Basic School and was assigned to 2nd Battalion, 8th Marines, where he served as a platoon and rifle company commander. His next tour took him to Marine Barracks, 8th and I, Washington, D.C. where he served at the Marine Corps Institute and as a ceremonial officer.

Allen then attended the Postgraduate Intelligence Program of the Defense Intelligence College, where he was the Distinguished Graduate. He subsequently served as the Marine Corps Fellow to the Center for Strategic and International Studies (CSIS). He was the first Marine Corps officer inducted as a Term Member of the Council on Foreign Relations.

Returning to the Fleet Marine Force in 1985, he commanded rifle and weapons companies and served as the operations officer of 3rd Battalion, 4th Marines. During this period he received the Leftwich Leadership Trophy. In 1988, Allen reported to the U.S. Naval Academy, where he taught in the Political Science Department and also served as the jump officer and jumpmaster of the academy. In 1990 he received the William P. Clements Award as military instructor of the year.

Allen reported to The Basic School as the director of the Infantry Officer Course from 1990 to 1992 and was subsequently selected by the Commandant of the Marine Corps Fellows Program, which provides "assignment to either a prominent national foreign policy/public policy research institution or to a national security studies program at a selected university". Allen has served as a special assistant on the staffs of the 30th Commandant of the Marine Corps and the commanding general of Marine Corps Combat Development Command. In 1994, he served as the Division G-3 Operations Officer for the 2nd Marine Division and subsequently assumed command of 2nd Battalion, 4th Marines; re-designated as 2nd Battalion, 6th Marines. This unit served with JTF-160 in Operation SEA SIGNAL during Caribbean contingency operations in 1994, and as part of the Landing Force of the 6th Fleet in Operation JOINT ENDEAVOR during Balkans contingency operations in 1995–1996.

Following battalion command, Allen reported as the senior aide-de-camp to the 31st Commandant of the Marine Corps, Charles C. Krulak, ultimately serving as his military secretary.

He commanded The Basic School from 1999 to 2001, when he was selected in April 2001 to return to the Naval Academy as the deputy commandant. Allen became the 79th Commandant of Midshipmen in January 2002, the first Marine Corps officer to serve in this position at the Naval Academy. In January 2003 Allen was nominated for appointment to the rank of brigadier general.

Allen's first tour as a general officer was as the principal director of Asian and Pacific Affairs in the Office of the United States Secretary of Defense, a position he occupied for nearly three years. From 2006–2008, Allen served as deputy commanding general of the II Marine Expeditionary Force and commanding general of the 2nd Marine Expeditionary Brigade, deploying to Iraq for Operation Iraqi Freedom 06-08, serving as the deputy commanding general of Multi-National Forces West and II MEF (Forward) in Al Anbar Province, Iraq. In January 2007 Allen was nominated for appointment to the grade of major general.

In June 2008, Secretary of Defense Robert Gates announced Allen's nomination for promotion to the rank of lieutenant general.
He served as the deputy commander of the U.S. Central Command from July 15, 2008, until July 18, 2011, at MacDill Air Force Base. On June 30, 2010, Allen temporarily commanded Central Command after General David Petraeus left to assume command of the International Security Assistance Force in Afghanistan. He served as acting commander until General James Mattis took command on August 11.
Allen was promoted to general by Chairman of the Joint Chiefs of Staff, Admiral Mike Mullen prior to his assumption of command of ISAF, and U.S. Forces Afghanistan (USFOR-A) on July 18, 2011.

Allen's foreign awards include the Mongolian Meritorious Service Medal, First Class; the Polish Army Medal in Gold; the Taiwan Order of the Resplendent Banner; the French Legion of Honor; the Order of Merit of the Italian Republic; Honorary Officer of the Order of Australia; and the Ghazi Mir Bacha Khan Medal.

On March 6, 2012, he received the Polish Afghanistan Star Medal from Polish President, Bronisław Komorowski.

On April 20, 2012, he received another Polish award, the Commander's Cross of the Order of Merit of the Republic of Poland.

In November 2012, he was investigated along with Jill Kelley. In response to the investigation, Secretary Panetta suspended his confirmation hearing for commander of EUCOM and requested the U.S. Congress to speed the confirmation of General Joseph F. Dunford, Jr. to command of forces in Afghanistan. On January 22, 2013, Allen was cleared in a misconduct inquiry.

On February 10, 2013, Allen relinquished command of the International Security Assistance Force and U.S. Forces Afghanistan (USFOR-A) to General Dunford.

On February 19, 2013, U.S. President Obama accepted Allen's request to retire from the military as his wife fell seriously ill.

On April 29, 2013, Allen's retirement ceremony was held at the United States Naval Academy.

Post-military career 
After leaving the military, Allen continued to work as an adviser to Secretary of State John Kerry and former Defense Secretary Chuck Hagel. In this capacity he worked closely with Israeli, Palestinian, and Jordanian interlocutors on the Israeli-Palestinian Peace Plan.

On June 13, 2013, Allen joined the Brookings Institution as a distinguished fellow.

On September 11, 2014, the Obama Administration announced that Allen would coordinate international efforts against the Islamic State in Iraq and Syria. He was named as the Special Presidential Envoy for the Global Coalition against ISIL, a position he would hold for 15 months. Allen's diplomatic efforts increased the size of the coalition to 65 members.

On October 23, 2015, the White House announced his departure from the post. He officially departed that role on November 12, 2015, and was succeeded by Brett McGurk.

On October 4, 2017, Allen was named the seventh president of Brookings, succeeding Strobe Talbott.

Allen was a member of the Homeland Security Advisory Council until his appointment expired on August 31, 2020.

Since 2019, he has also been serving on the Transatlantic Task Force of the German Marshall Fund and the Bundeskanzler-Helmut-Schmidt-Stiftung (BKHS), co-chaired by Karen Donfried and Wolfgang Ischinger.

On June 8, 2022, Allen was placed on leave at the Brookings Institution amid a federal investigation into his role in an illegal lobbying campaign on behalf of the wealthy Persian Gulf nation of Qatar. He has not been charged with a crime.  He officially resigned from Brookings Institution on June 12, 2022, and executive vice president Ted Gayer was named acting president. 

In January 2023, the Justice Department informed Allen that federal prosecutors closed the investigation into whether he secretly lobbied for the government of Qatar and that no criminal charges would be brought against him under the Foreign Agents Registration Act, or any other law, based on, or as a result of, Allen's trip to Qatar in June 2017 or the government's investigation of those events.

Political role

Allen was a featured speaker at the 2016 Democratic National Convention in Philadelphia on July 27, 2016, on the topic of national security, and was later revealed to be on Clinton's list of possible picks for Vice President. He criticized Republican nominee Donald Trump and endorsed Hillary Clinton for President.

FBI investigation
In June 2022, Allen's electronic data was reportedly seized in relation to potential illegal lobbying on behalf of the government of Qatar. The data was obtained via a warrant that was filed in April in a Federal District Court in Central California. Federal prosecutors obtained records that they believed indicated that Allen not only secretly lobbied for Qatar but also lied to investigators about his role and attempted to withhold evidence that was sought from him via a federally issued subpoena. In January 2023, the Justice Department informed Allen that federal prosecutors closed the investigation into whether he secretly lobbied for the government of Qatar and that no criminal charges would be brought against him under the Foreign Agents Registration Act, or any other law, based on, or as a result of, Allen's trip to Qatar in June 2017 or the government's investigation of those events.

Awards and decorations
Allen's personal decorations include the following:

Notes

References
This article incorporates text in the public domain from the United States Marine Corps.

External links

Profile: Gen John R Allen at BBC News
General John R. Allen, USMC (Ret.)'s presentation at the Pritzker Military Museum & Library on June 4, 2014

|-

|-

|-

|-

|-

 

1953 births
Commanders of the Order of Merit of the Republic of Poland
Commandeurs of the Légion d'honneur
Honorary Officers of the Order of Australia
Living people
People from Fort Belvoir, Virginia
Petraeus scandal
Recipients of the Defense Distinguished Service Medal
Recipients of the Defense Superior Service Medal
Recipients of the Leftwich Trophy
Recipients of the Legion of Merit
Recipients of the NATO Meritorious Service Medal
Recipients of the Polish Army Medal
United States Marine Corps generals
United States Naval Academy alumni
United States Special Envoys
Walsh School of Foreign Service alumni
National Intelligence University alumni
National War College alumni
The Washington Institute for Near East Policy
Brookings Institution people